Los Super Seven is a studio album released by supergroup Los Super Seven. It was released in September 15, 1998 by RCA Nashville. Freddy Fender and Flaco Jiménez, both from Texas Tornados, formed Los Super Seven, along Joe Ely, Rick Trevino, David Hidalgo and Cesar Rosas (of Los Lobos' fame), and Tejano vocalist Ruben Ramos. The album peaked at number-one in the Billboard Regional Mexican Albums chart and reached top ten in the Billboard Top Latin Song chart. Los Super Seven earned them the Grammy Award for Best Mexican-American Performance at the 41st Grammy Awards. A portion of the proceeds of the album were destined to the National Council of La Raza a non-profit organization that represents Latino interests and causes.

Track listing
El Canoero (The Canoeist) – 3:19
Piensa en Mí (Think of Me) – 3:53
Mi Ranchito (My Ranch) – 3:51
Un Beso al Viento (A Kiss to the Wind) – 2:31
La Sirena (The Mermaid) – 2:53
Un Lunes por la Mañana (Early on a Monday Morning) – 3:18
Deportee (Plane Wreck at Los Gatos) – 3:38
La Morena – 2:55
Margarita – 3:25
La Madrugada (The Dawn) – 2:40
El Ausente (The Absentee) – 3:39
Río de Tenampa – 4:23
Las Norteñitas – 1:00

Chart performance

References

1998 debut albums
Los Super Seven albums
Spanish-language albums
RCA Records albums
Grammy Award for Best Mexican/Mexican-American Album